Colegio Católico Notre Dame is a  coeducational Roman Catholic school located in Caguas, Puerto Rico. Notre Dame is composed of a pre pre-kindergarten, pre-kindergarten, kindergarten, an elementary school, a middle school, and a high school. They are all located on the same campus.

History
The Colegio Católico Notre Dame was founded on October 3, 1916 by Redemptorist Priests (of the Congregation of the Most Holy Redeemer) with the help of the Congregation of the School Sisters of Notre Dame. Originally the school had the name of Colegio Dulce Nombre de Jesús but this was eventually changed to the name that it has today.

Notre Dame initially accepted students from kindergarten to the fourth grade. By 1921, the school had expanded to include the eighth grade. In 1947, the first 24 students graduated twelfth grade from Notre Dame.

In 1956, the grades from seventh to twelfth were moved to Troche Avenue in Caguas, its current location.  The high school was then named Notre Dame High School in honor of the Virgin Mary and the School Sisters of Notre Dame. The elementary school is located next to the Catedral Dulce Nombre de Jesús in the "plaza" of Caguas. Notre Dame also has a pre-kindergarten (formed in 1986) and a kindergarten (formed in 1950), both located in the same campus as the high school. In 2017, the elementary grades were moved into a new building next to the Neumann Hall and Auditorium, in a new building.

In 1964 Notre Dame received accreditation by the Middle States Association of Colleges and Schools. Eventually, the school went back to the name Colegio Católico Notre Dame in order to unify the schools.

In 1997, the elementary school received the "Blue Ribbon Award" of Excellence in Education awarded by the "Blue Ribbon Schools Program".

Notre Dame is currently the biggest private school in Puerto Rico with more than 2,300 students from pre-kindergarten through twelfth grade.

School motto
The school's motto is that of the School Sisters of Notre Dame virtus et scientia, which translates to "virtue and knowledge" from Latin.

School anthem 
Lyrics to the school anthem, as copied from the school website:Viva, viva

Notre Dame que viva

ahora y en el porvenir

Alma máter de mis tiernos años,

a Dios me enseñas a servir.

A tí siempre seré leal,

Alma máter, eres mi ideal.

Que por sólo sendas de virtud

Tú guías a la juventud.

Viva, viva

Notre Dame que viva

ahora y en el porvenir

Alma máter de mis tiernos años

a Dios me enseñas a servir.

Clubs and organizations
Some of the school's clubs are:

 Advocati Iustitia (Law Club)
 Amnistía Internacional Capítulo Notre Dame
 Astronomy Club
 Chemistry Club
 Chess Club
 Comic Book Club
 Dance Team Club (Founded in 2011-2012)
 Drama Club
 Ecology Club
 English Club
 Forensics League
 History Club
 Huellas (Religious ministry group)
 In Focus (Photography Club)
 Library Club
 Math Club
 Ministry of Music (Religious music ministry, an offshoot of the school choir and with many shared members)
 Model United Nations Club 
 National Honor Society 
 Oratory Club (Spanish equivalent of Forensics League)
 Robotics Club
 Scala (School newspaper, founded in 1946)
 School Band
 School Choir "Coral Juvenil Mare Mia"
 Seoul Knights (Korean Club)
 Soles Verdes Club (Ecology Club)
 Scientia Club (Science Club for the Middle School)
 Student Council (Formed in 1958)
 T.E.A ("Taller de Expresión Artística" or Drama and Art Club)

Facilities

The elementary school was located next to the city's cathedral, and was moved to a new facility in the high school campus in 2017.

The high school campus has a soccer field, a track, volleyball and basketball courts. The Neumann Hall Auditorium serves as a cafeteria and a place to hold large events and mass.

It also consists of many other rooms used for reunions.

In 2017, a Cybercafe was added to the school's facilities. It consists of a menu in which you pay apart from the Cafeteria.

Famous alumni
 Ana Isabelle, singer, actress, dancer and entrepreneur.
 Catalina Morales, Miss Universe Puerto Rico 2015.
 José Aponte Hernández, Representative-at-Large and former Speaker of the House of Representatives of Puerto Rico, former Secretary General of the New Progressive Party
 Felipe Crespo, Baseball player.
 César Crespo, Baseball player.
 Félix Omar Fernández, Olympic Athlete, Sydney 2000.
 Juan Dalmau, former candidate for Governor of Puerto Rico, Secretary General of the Puerto Rican Independence Party
 José Luis Dalmau, Actual President of the Senate  Senator of Puerto Rico
 Janice Olivencia, Golf player.
 Carlos Manuel Rodríguez, candidate for future canonization; beatified on April 29, 2001.
Lionel Perez Martinez, sports media personality, La Garata.
Luis J. Haddock, Tennis player.
Ismael Cruz Córdova, actor.
Juliette Feliciano Ortiz, actress, dancer, and singer.
Krystell Santiago Estrella, scientist, singer, musician, and film director.
Gerardo Lamadrid Castillo, published author and writer.
Leandro Antonetti, Soccer player, Polvorín FC.
Rubén Estrada (Alejo), singer.
Ivan Rafael Gandia-Rosa, Basketball player.

Notes and references

External links
 
 Official website of Colegio Católico Notre Dame (Middle and High School)
 Official website of Colegio Católico Notre Dame (Elementary School)

Elementary schools in Puerto Rico
Catholic secondary schools in Puerto Rico
Caguas, Puerto Rico
Educational institutions established in 1916
1916 establishments in Puerto Rico